Shri Dhokeshwar Mahavidyalaya, is a college in Takali Dhokeshwar village of Parner tehsil of Ahmednagar district in state of Maharashtra India. The college established on 19 September 1994. The college got permanent affiliation from University of Pune.

Courses
Shri Dhokeshwar college provides following courses. Intake capacity is up to 120 students per course.

Bachelor of Arts
 English
 Marathi
 Hindi
 Geography
 History
 Political Science
 Physical Education

Bachelor of Science
 Physics
 Chemistry
 Botany
 Electronics
 Zoology
 Mathematics

See also
 Takali Dhokeshwar
 Shree Hareshwar Vidyalaya, Karjule Hareshwar

References

Universities and colleges in Maharashtra
Education in Ahmednagar district
Colleges affiliated to Savitribai Phule Pune University
Educational institutions established in 1994
1994 establishments in Maharashtra